Trematocranus pachychilus is a species of cichlid endemic to Lake Malawi. It is confined to Jafua Bay area of the Lake Malawi.

Etymology
The species name pachychilus means thick-lip in Greek.

Description
This species can reach a length of 31.5–33.8mm. Head steep, whereas body deep and laterally compressed. Snout pointed and mouth terminal. Lips very thick. Teeth slender, generally straight and slightly curved inwards. Body brownish to slightly greyish in color. Dorsum darker than belly.

References

Endemic fauna of Mozambique
pachycilus
Fish described in 2018
Cichlid fish of Africa
Fish of Lake Malawi